The König SD 570 is a four-cylinder, two-stroke, single ignition radial aircraft engine designed for powered paragliders, powered parachutes and single place ultralight trikes.

The engine was originally designed and produced by Dieter König of Berlin, Germany. The design was sold to Zanzottera Technologies of Italy and then sold again, along with the rest of Zanzottera's two-stroke ultralight aircraft engine line to Compact Radial Engines of Surrey, British Columbia, Canada. Compact Radial Engines was then in turn acquired by Fiate Aviation Co., Ltd. of Hefei, Anhui, China in August 2017. Fiate Aviation did not advertise the engine as available in 2021.

Development
The SD 570 is an unusual four-cylinder radial engine that is very compact and light weight at only . The engine features single capacitor discharge ignition, a single Bing 49 diaphragm-type carburetor and rotary valve induction. Compact Radial Engines offered it without a reduction drive, although when Zanzottera built it an optional 1.75:1 cog belt reduction drive was available. Starting is electric starter only and a recoil starter is not an option.

Earlier versions produced  at 4200 rpm with a slide-type carburetor and reduction drive. Time between overhaul is rated as 300 hours.

The SD 570 shares the same bore and stroke as the smaller three-cylinder König SC 430 radial engine.

Variants
Zanzottera SD 570
Four-cylinder, two-stroke, single-ignition, radial aircraft engine producing  at 4200 rpm. Equipped with a slide-type carburetor and an optional reduction drive.
Compact Radial Engines SD 570
Four-cylinder, two-stroke, single-ignition, radial aircraft engine producing  at 4200 rpm. Equipped with a Bing 49 diaphragm-type carburetor and no reduction drive.

Applications
AMF Chevvron 2-32
MFI BA-12 Sländan

Specifications (CD 570)

See also

References

Compact Radial Engines aircraft engines
Zanzottera aircraft engines
Air-cooled aircraft piston engines
Two-stroke aircraft piston engines
Radial engines